The Starlight, 167 N. College Ave., was a bar and concert venue in Old Town Fort Collins, Colorado. The bar was known as "Mountain Tap" for many years, before a late '90s name change. The bar went through a series of owners in the mid-2000s, including a collective headed by local nightclub magnates Joe Vader and Lucky Kerig. The nightclub reopened in February 2007 as "Hodi's Half-Note".

The Starlight hosted late schizophrenic keyboardist-vocalist Wesley Willis and defunct post-punk rock band Caril featuring the Alberts brothers, Cameron and Kirk, Myke Fedyk and Jason Sharp. Also, the bar was one of many Fort Collins locations where the movie Our Burden Is Light was filmed.

During 2003, the Fort Collins based punk band ALL booked three sold out shows for their Stockage 2003 Festival.

According to its MySpace site, The Starlight hosted Cherry Poppin' Daddies,  Frank Black & The Catholics, G. Love and Special Sauce, Jello Biafra, John Mayer, Kenny Wayne Shepherd, Lagwagon, Me First and the Gimme Gimmes, Rise Against, Social Distortion, The Specials, Vanilla Ice, ALL and Ween, among others.

External links
 Official website

Culture of Fort Collins, Colorado
Buildings and structures in Fort Collins, Colorado